Brendan Emmet Irvine (born 17 May 1996), nicknamed the "Wee Rooster", is an Irish amateur boxer from Belfast. He won a silver medal in the men's 49 kg division at the 2015 European Games, becoming the first ever medalist for Ireland at the Games. He moved up to the 52 kg weight class in 2016, winning another Irish senior title and also competing at the 2016 Olympic Games in Rio. In 2017 Irvine won another major medal for Ireland for the European championships finishing in top 3 taking away a bronze medal.
The next year he went in to the CWG in the Gold Coast Australia bagging another silver medal for NI. Inactive for 2019 with a few injury's he came back hungry as ever and qualified for the 2020 Olympic Games in Tokyo beating a tricky boxer from Hungary in the Europeans Olympic qualifier taking him to the top 8 spot.

References

External links
 
 
 
 
 
 

1996 births
Living people
Boxers from Belfast
Male boxers from Northern Ireland
Irish male boxers
Boxers at the 2015 European Games
European Games silver medalists for Ireland
European Games medalists in boxing
Boxers at the 2016 Summer Olympics
Boxers at the 2020 Summer Olympics
Olympic boxers of Ireland
Commonwealth Games medallists in boxing
Commonwealth Games silver medallists for Northern Ireland
Boxers at the 2018 Commonwealth Games
Flyweight boxers
Medallists at the 2018 Commonwealth Games